Sinningia helioana is a tuberous member of the flowering plant family Gesneriaceae. It is found in Brazil.

References

helioana
Flora of Brazil